Central serous chorioretinopathy (CSC or CSCR), also known as central serous retinopathy (CSR), is an eye disease that causes visual impairment, often temporary, usually in one eye. When the disorder is active it is characterized by leakage of fluid under the retina that has a propensity to accumulate under the central macula. This results in blurred or distorted vision (metamorphopsia). A blurred or gray spot in the central visual field is common when the retina is detached. Reduced visual acuity may persist after the fluid has disappeared.

The disease is considered of unknown cause. It mostly affects white males in the age group 20 to 50 (male:female ratio 6:1) and occasionally other groups. The condition is believed to be exacerbated by stress or corticosteroid use.

Pathophysiology 
Recently, central serous chorioretinopathy has been understood to be part of the pachychoroid spectrum. In pachychoroid spectrum disorders, of which CSR represents stage II, the choroid, the highly vascularized layer below the retina, is thickened and congested with increased blood vessel diameter, especially in the deep choroid (the so-called Haller's layer). This results in increased pressure from the deep choroid against the superficial choroid close to the retina, damaging the fine blood vessels (capillaries) needed to supply oxygen and nutrients to the retinal pigment epithelium and retina. Additionally, fluid can leak from these damaged vessels and accumulate under the retina.

Different stages of the pachychoroid are defined depending on the amount of cumulative damage. If there are defects in the retinal pigment epithelium without accumulation of fluid below the retina, a pachychoroid pigmentepitheliopathy (PPE) is present. Accumulation of fluid results in central serous chorioretinopathy (CSR). The development of secondary blood vessels, so-called choroidal neovascularization (CNV) leads to pachychoroid neovasculopathy (PNV). If parts of these new vessels bulge outward, so-called aneurysms develop within this CNV, defining pachychoroid aneurysmal type 1 CNV (or, still widely used, polypoidal choroidal vasculopathy (PCV)).

Since the individual stages develop one after the other from the respective preliminary stage, pachychoroidal diseases of the macula are divided into 4 stages according to Siedlecki, Schworm and Priglinger:

Risk factors 
CSR is sometimes called idiopathic CSR which means that its cause is unknown. Nevertheless, stress appears to play an important role. An oft-cited but potentially inaccurate conclusion is that persons in stressful occupations, such as airplane pilots, have a higher incidence of CSR.

CSR has also been associated with cortisol and corticosteroids.  Persons with CSR have higher levels of cortisol. Cortisol is a hormone secreted by the adrenal cortex which allows the body to deal with stress, which may explain the CSR-stress association. There is extensive evidence to the effect that corticosteroids (e.g. cortisone), commonly used to treat inflammations, allergies, skin conditions and even certain eye conditions, can trigger CSR, aggravate it and cause relapses. In a case report, a young male was using Prednisolone and began to display subretinal fluid indicative of CSR. With the discontinuation of the steroid drop the subretinal fluid resolved and did not show any sign of recurrence. Thus indicating the steroid was the probable cause of the CSR. A study of 60 persons with Cushing's syndrome found CSR in 3 (5%). Cushing's syndrome is characterized by very high cortisol levels. Certain sympathomimetic drugs have also been associated with causing the disease.

Evidence has also implicated helicobacter pylori (see gastritis) as playing a role. It would appear that the presence of the bacteria is well correlated with visual acuity and other retinal findings following an attack.

Evidence also shows that people with MPGN type II kidney disease can develop retinal abnormalities including CSR caused by deposits of the same material that originally damaged the glomerular basement membrane in the kidneys.

Diagnosis 

The diagnosis usually starts with a dilated examination of the retina, followed with confirmation by optical coherence tomography and fluorescein angiography. The angiography test will usually show one or more fluorescent spots with fluid leakage. In 10%-15% of the cases these will appear in a "classic" smokestack shape. Differential diagnosis should be immediately performed to rule out retinal detachment, which is a medical emergency.
A clinical record should be taken to keep a timeline of the detachment. The affected eye will sometimes exhibit a refractive spectacle prescription that is more far-sighted than the fellow eye due to the decreased focal length caused by the raising of the retina.

Indocyanine green angiography or laser Doppler imaging can be used to reveal the underlying swollen choroidal vessels under the retinal pigment epithelium and assess the health of the retina in the affected area which can be useful in making a treatment decision.

Treatment
Any ongoing corticosteroid treatment should be tapered and stopped, where possible.  It is important to check current medication, including nasal sprays and creams, for ingredients of corticosteroids, if found seek advice from a medical practitioner for an alternative.

Most eyes with CSR undergo spontaneous resorption of subretinal fluid within 3–4 months. Recovery of visual acuity usually follows. Treatment should be considered if resorption does not occur within 3–4 months, spontaneously or as the result of counselling. The available evidence suggests that half-dose (or half-fluence) photodynamic therapy is the treatment of choice for CSR with subretinalfluid for longer than 3–4 months.

Due to the natural disease course of CSR - in which spontaneous resolution of subretinal fluid may occur - retrospective studies may erroneously report positive treatment outcomes and should, therefore, be evaluated with caution.

Laser treatments
Full-dose photodynamic therapy (PDT) with verteporfin was first described in CSR in 2003. Later, reduced-settings PDT (half-dose, half-fluence, and half-time) was found to have the same efficacy and a lower chance of complications. Follow-up studies have confirmed the treatment's long-term effectiveness including its effectiveness for the chronic variant of the disease. In the PLACE trial, half-dose photodynamic therapy was found to be superior compared to high-density subthreshold micropulse laser, both with regard to anatomical and functional outcomes. Indocyanine green angiography can be used to predict how the patient will respond to PDT.

Laser photocoagulation, which effectively burns the leak area shut, may be considered in cases where there is little improvement in a 3- to 4-month duration, and the leakage is confined to a single or a few sources of leakage at a safe distance from the fovea. Laser photocoagulation is not indicated for cases where the leak is very near the central macula or for cases where the leakage is widespread and its source is difficult to identify. Laser photocoagulation can permanently damage vision where applied. Carefully tuned lasers can limit this damage. Even so, laser photocoagulation is not a preferred treatment for leaks in the central vision and is considered an outdated treatment by some doctors. Foveal attenuation has been associated with more than 4 months' duration of symptoms, however a better long-term outcome has not been demonstrated with laser photocoagulation than without photocoagulation.

In chronic cases, transpupillary thermotherapy has been suggested as an alternative to laser photocoagulation where the leak is in the central macula.

Yellow micropulse laser has shown promise in very limited retrospective trials.

Oral medications
Spironolactone is a mineralocorticoid receptor antagonist that may help reduce the fluid associated with CSR. In a retrospective study noted by Acta Ophthalmologica, spironolactone improved visual acuity in CSR patients over the course of 8 weeks.

Eplerenone is another mineralocorticoid receptor antagonist that has been thought to reduce the subretinal fluid that is present with CSR. In a study noted in International Journal of Ophthalmology, results showed Epleronone decreased the subretinal fluid both horizontally and vertically over time. However, the most recent and largest randomized controlled trial showed that eplerenone has no significant effect on chronic CSR.

Low dosage ibuprofen has been shown to quicken recovery in some cases.

Topical treatment
Though no topical treatment has been proven to be effective in the treatment of CSR. Some doctors have attempted to use nonsteroidal topical medications to reduce the subretinal fluid associated with CSR. The nonsteroidal topical medications that are sometimes used to treat CSR are, Ketorolac, Diclofenac, or Bromfenac.

Lifestyle changes
People who have irregular sleep patterns, type A personalities, sleep apnea, or systemic hypertension are more susceptible to CSR, as stated in Medscape.  "The pathogenesis here is thought to be elevated circulating cortisol and epinephrine, which affect the autoregulation of the choroidal circulation." With management of these lifestyle patterns and associated cortisol and epinephrine levels, it has been shown that the fluid associated with CSR can spontaneously resolve. Melatonin has been shown to help regulate sleep in people who have irregular sleep patterns (such as 3rd shift workers, or overnight employees), in turn, better regulating cortisol and epinephrine levels to manage CSR.

A Cochrane review seeking to compare the effectiveness of various treatment for CSR found low quality evidence that half-dose PDT treatment resulted in improved visual acuity and less recurrence of CSR in patients with acute CSR, compared to patients in the control group. The review also found benefits in micropulse laser treatments, where patients with acute and chronic CSR had improved visual acuity compared to control patients.

Prognosis
The prognosis for CSR is generally excellent. While immediate vision loss may be as poor as 20/200 in the affected eye, clinically, over 90% of patients regain 20/25 vision or better within 45 days. Once the fluid has resolved, either spontaneously or through treatment, distortion is reduced and visual acuity improves as the eye heals.  However, some visual abnormalities can remain even where visual acuity is measured at 20/20. This includes localized reductions in light sensitivity as assessed by visual field testing (microperimetry). Lasting problems include decreased night vision, reduced color discrimination, and localized distortion caused by scarring of the sub-retinal layers.

Complications include subretinal neovascularization and pigment epithelial detachment.

The disease can re-occur causing progressive vision loss. There is also a chronic form, titled as type II central serous retinopathy, which occurs in approximately 5% of cases.  This exhibits diffuse rather than localized abnormality of the pigment epithelium, producing a persistent subretinal fluid.  The serous fluid in these cases tends to be shallow rather than dome shaped.  The prognosis for this condition is less favorable and continued clinical consultation is advised.

See also 
 Diabetic retinopathy
 Geographic atrophy
 Hypertensive retinopathy
 Macular degeneration
 Posterior vitreous detachment

References

External links 

Disorders of choroid and retina